Regina Amstetten is a 1954 West German drama film directed by Kurt Neumann and starring Luise Ullrich, Carl Raddatz, and Carl Esmond.

The film's sets were designed by the art director Gabriel Pellon. It was shot at the Göttingen Studios.

Cast

References

External links

1954 drama films
German drama films
West German films
Films directed by Kurt Neumann
Films based on short fiction
German black-and-white films
1950s German films
Films shot at Göttingen Studios
1950s German-language films